Balaka microcarpa is a species of palm tree. It is endemic to Fiji, where it grows in dense forests. It is threatened by habitat loss.

References

microcarpa
Endemic flora of Fiji
Endangered plants
Taxonomy articles created by Polbot
Taxa named by Max Burret